Amariah is a Hebrew male name meaning "God has said" or "Promised by God". Variations can include Amarissa, Amaris, or Amarit. Amariah is different from Amaria, a Greek female name meaning "Moon, Alluring, Pure, Illuminating."

Amariah may refer to:
Amariah, biblical characters
Amariah Brigham (1798–1849), American psychiatrist 
Amariah Farrow (born 1980), Canadian football player

External links
Definition of the name "Amariah" (1)

Hebrew-language names